Yvan Lebourgeois (born 26 October 1962) is a French former professional football defender.

Career
Lebourgeois was born in Noyers-Bocage. He spent almost all his playing career at Stade Malherbe Caen. He holds the record for SM Caen appearances in Division 1, having played 200 first-team matches between 1988 and 1995.

References

External links

1962 births
Living people
Association football defenders
French footballers
Stade Malherbe Caen players
Ligue 1 players
Ligue 2 players